The Matitone (a popular nickname meaning literally "big pencil", officially San Benigno North Tower) is a skyscraper designed by Skidmore, Owings & Merrill, Mario Lanata and Andrea Messina and finished building in 1992, used as a business center located in the district of San Teodoro, in the San Benigno neighborhood, near the Genova-West highway.

Activities based in the Matitone 
The Matitone is home to several administrative offices including:
 Municipality of Genoa, Services Private Building and Urban Development.

Other information 
In 2006 it was used for filming the video for the song Cosa vuoi che sia by Ligabue.
In Savona there is a smaller, similar building that was named Matitino in honor of his older peer in Genoa.

External links 
  Scheda del Matitone - Emporis.com
 Webcam posta sul Matitone - sito del comune di Genova

Skyscrapers in Genoa
Skyscraper office buildings in Italy
Skidmore, Owings & Merrill buildings